NGC 5248 (also known as Caldwell 45) is a compact intermediate spiral galaxy about 59 million light-years away in the constellation Boötes.  It is a member of the NGC 5248 Group of galaxies, itself one of the Virgo III Groups strung out to the east of the Virgo Supercluster of galaxies.  Distance measurements to NGC 5248 vary from 41.4 million light-years (12.7 Mpc) to 74.0 million light-years (22.7 Mpc), averaging about 58.7 million light-years (17.7 Mpc).

References

External links

Intermediate spiral galaxies
Boötes
5248
08616
048130
045